The Vietnamese National Football Second League has 17 teams, both professional and semi-professional, is divided into 3 groups, 2 groups with 6 teams and 1 group with 5 teams. 

Teams play in a round robin format. the 3 top teams as well as the 2nd team with most points qualifies for promotion playoff. 

The 2 winners are promoted to the V.League 2. No teams are relegated and no foreign players are permitted to play.

Group stage

Group A

Group B

Group C

Knockout phase

Semi-finals

Final

Vietnamese Second Division seasons
3